Hermanos Coraje is a Mexican telenovela produced by José P. Delfin for Televisión Independiente de México in 1972.

Cast 
Jaime Fernández as Juan Coraje
Fernando Larrañaga as Lalo Coraje
Jorge Lavat as Jeronimo Coraje
Julissa as Clara Barros /Diana Lemos / Marcia
Edna Necoechea as Rita Massiel de Coraje
Gloria Marin as Josefa
Ana Luisa Pelufo as Mamá Ana Coraje
Pilar Sen as Margarita Rosa de Castilla
Sonia Amelio as Lina
Luis Aragón
Carlos Riquelme
Luis Miranda
Jorge Mistral as Pedro Barros #1
Armando Calvo as Pedro Barros #2
Pedro Armendáriz Jr.
Rita Macedo
Emma Roldán as Dominga
Victor Alcocer
Carmelita González
Aurora Clavel
Yerye Beirute
Ada Carrasco
Carlos Cardona
Jaime Vega as Comisario
Ramiro Hernández A

References

External links 

Mexican telenovelas
1972 telenovelas
Televisa telenovelas
Spanish-language telenovelas